Mark I & II is a 1973 compilation album by Deep Purple, released by EMI's German subsidiary Electrola. It contains material originally released between 1968 and 1973. This double LP was released after Ian Gillan had left Deep Purple in June 1973.

This is the first album to feature the single A-sides "Emmaretta", "Black Night", and "Strange Kind of Woman", the B-side "When a Blind Man Cries", and the single edit of "Woman from Tokyo". "Highway Star" is the Made in Japan live version.

Track listing
All songs written by Ritchie Blackmore, Ian Gillan, Roger Glover, Jon Lord and Ian Paice except where indicated.

Mark I
Side one
 "Hush" (Joe South) – 4.22
 "Mandrake Root" (Ritchie Blackmore/Rod Evans/Jon Lord) – 6.03
 "Why Didn't Rosemary?" (Blackmore/Lord/Evans/Nick Simper/Ian Paice) – 4.56
 "Hey Joe" (Billy Roberts) – 7.21

Side two
"Wring That Neck" (Blackmore/Lord/Simper/Paice) – 5.11
 "Emmaretta" (Lord/Blackmore/Evans) – 2.58
 "Help!" (Lennon/McCartney) – 6.02
 "Chasing Shadows" (Lord/Paice) – 5.31

Mark II
Side three
"Black Night" – 3.29
"Speed King" – 5.49
"Strange Kind of Woman" – 4.00
"Into the Fire" – 3.29
"When a Blind Man Cries" – 3.29

Side four
"Smoke on the Water" – 5.49
"Woman from Tokyo" – 2.44
"Highway Star" – 6.46

Personnel
Mark I
 Rod Evans – lead vocals
 Ritchie Blackmore – guitar
 Jon Lord – organ, backing vocals
 Nick Simper – bass, vocals 
 Ian Paice – drums

Mark II
 Ian Gillan – lead vocals 
 Ritchie Blackmore – guitar
 Jon Lord – keyboards, organ
 Roger Glover – bass, vocals 
 Ian Paice – drums, percussion

Charts

References

External links
thehighwaystar.com 
[www.thehighwaystar.com Mark I & II] 
discogs.com 
[www.discogs.com Deep Purple – Mark I & II ]

1973 compilation albums
Deep Purple compilation albums
Purple Records compilation albums
Albums recorded at IBC Studios
Albums produced by Derek Lawrence